Chvojnica is a village and municipality in Myjava District in the Trenčín Region of north-western Slovakia.

History
In historical records the village was first mentioned in 1957.

Geography
The municipality lies at an altitude of 370 metres and covers an area of 16.345 km². It has a population of about 400 people.

References

External links

  Official page
https://web.archive.org/web/20071217080336/http://www.statistics.sk/mosmis/eng/run.html

Villages and municipalities in Myjava District